Class 108 may refer to:

British Rail Class 108
GWR 108 Class